Elections to Trafford Metropolitan Borough Council were held on 10 June 2004.

Due to demographic changes in the Borough since its formation in 1973, and in common with most other English Councils in 2004, substantial boundary changes were implemented in time for these elections.
The most notable changes were as follows:

 Most of the former wards of Park and Talbot were merged to form a new Gorse Hill ward.
 Most of the former wards of Bucklow and St. Martins were merged to form a new Bucklow - St. Martins ward.
 The Hale ward ceased to exist, and two new wards were created from most of its area: Hale Barns and Hale Central.
 The Mersey St. Marys ward ceased to exist, and two new wards were created from most of its area: Ashton on Mersey and St. Marys.

Due to these changes, it was necessary for the whole Council to be re-elected for the first time since 1973. Each ward elected three candidates, with the first-placed candidate serving a four-year term of office, expiring in 2008, the second-placed candidate serving a three-year term of office, expiring in 2007, and the third-placed candidate serving a two-year term of office, expiring in 2006.
The Conservative Party gained overall control of the council from no overall control. Overall turnout was 46.3%.

After the election, the composition of the council was as follows:

Election result

Ward results

References

2004
2004 English local elections
2000s in Greater Manchester